The 1995–96 Israel State Cup (Gvia HaMedina) was the 57th season of Israel's nationwide football cup competition and the 42nd after the Israeli Declaration of Independence.

The competition was won by Maccabi Tel Aviv who had beaten Ironi Rishon LeZion 4–1 in the final.

As Maccabi Tel Aviv won the double, Ironi Rishon LeZion qualified to the 1996–97 UEFA Cup Winners' Cup, entering in the qualifying round.

Results

Seventh Round

Eighth Round

Round of 16

Quarter-finals

Semi-finals

Final

References
100 Years of Football 1906-2006, Elisha Shohat (Israel), 2006, p. 298
Israel 1995/96 RSSSF
Upset at the Cup: Tzeirei Jaffa from Liga Alef eliminated Hapoel Tayibe from Artzit 3-1 (Article No. 137705) Haaretz, 31.12.1995, Haaretz Archive 

Israel State Cup
State Cup
Israel State Cup seasons